Helicocranchia is a genus of small glass squids from the family Cranchiidae, known as piglet squid. They are characterized by possessing a very large funnel and in having a pair of small paddle-like fins which are attached to a part of the gladius which sits above the muscular mantle. These squid undergo a slow descent starting near the surface as paralarvae moving down to lower mesopelagic depths as near-adults.

The genus contains bioluminescent species.

Species
There are three species of Helicocranchia:

Helicocranchia joubini (Voss, 1962)
Helicocranchia papillata (Voss, 1960)
Helicocranchia pfefferi Massy, 1907

References

External links

CephBase: Helicocranchia
Tree of Life web project: Helicocranchia

Squid
Cephalopod genera
Bioluminescent molluscs
Taxa named by Annie Massy